Tim Christian (born 30 October 1960) is a Canadian rower. He competed in the men's coxed four event at the 1984 Summer Olympics.

References

External links
 

1960 births
Living people
Canadian male rowers
Olympic rowers of Canada
Rowers at the 1984 Summer Olympics
Sportspeople from British Columbia
Pan American Games medalists in rowing
Pan American Games bronze medalists for Canada
Rowers at the 1983 Pan American Games